Albert Galiton Watkins (May 5, 1818November 9, 1895) was an American politician and a member of the United States House of Representatives.

Biography
Watkins was born near Jefferson City, Tennessee, on May 5, 1818. He graduated from Holston College in Tennessee and studied law. He was admitted to the bar and began private practice at Panther Springs, Tennessee, in 1839.

Career
In 1845, Watkins was a member of the Tennessee House of Representatives. He was elected as a Whig to the Thirty-first and Thirty-second Congresses representing Tennessee's 2nd congressional district. He served from March 4, 1849, to March 3, 1853. He was an unsuccessful candidate for re-election in 1852 to the Thirty-third Congress.

After the districts had been reapportioned, he was elected to represent Tennessee's 1st congressional district as a member of the Democratic Party in both the Thirty-fourth and the Thirty-fifth Congresses. During that time, he served from March 4, 1855, to March 3, 1859.  He was not a candidate for re-election in 1858.

Death
Watkins engaged in the ministry and died in Mooresburg, Hawkins County, Tennessee, on November 9, 1895. He was interred in Westview Cemetery in Jefferson City, Tennessee.

References

External links

1818 births
1895 deaths
People from Jefferson County, Tennessee
American people of Welsh descent
Whig Party members of the United States House of Representatives from Tennessee
Democratic Party members of the United States House of Representatives from Tennessee
Members of the Tennessee House of Representatives
Tennessee lawyers
American slave owners